Pierre Menard (1766-1844) was the first Lieutenant Governor of Illinois, United States.

Pierre Menard may also refer to:
 Pierre Menard, Author of the Quixote, a fictional character by Jorge Luis Borges
 Pierre Menard, American violinist, and concertmaster for The Neon Philharmonic and second violinist for The Vermeer Quartet